Arola is a comune (municipality) in the Province of Verbano-Cusio-Ossola in the Italian region Piedmont, located about  northeast of Turin and about  southwest of Verbania.

The municipality of Arola contains the frazione (subdivision) Pianezza.

Arola borders the following municipalities: Cesara, Civiasco, Madonna del Sasso.

Demographic evolution

References

Cities and towns in Piedmont
Articles which contain graphical timelines
Populated places on Lake Orta